Walter Lundin (April 20, 1892 – June 21, 1954) was an American cinematographer who worked extensively in Hollywood during the silent era and had a career through the 1950s.

He was known for his work in films with Laurel and Hardy and Harold Lloyd (among them, Safety Last! and Grandma's Boy), and had a longtime collaboration with producer Hal Roach. Lloyd and his crew nicknamed Walter "The Dude".

Selected filmography 
 Mothers of Men (1917)
 A Sailor-Made Man (1921)
 Grandma's Boy (1922)
 Dr. Jack (1922)
 Safety Last! (1923)
 Why Worry? (1923)
 Girl Shy (1924)
 Hot Water (1924)
 The Freshman (1925)
 For Heaven's Sake (1926)
 The Kid Brother (1927)
 Welcome Danger (1929)
 Movie Crazy (1932)
 The Cat's-Paw (1934)
 Bonnie Scotland (1935)
 The Bohemian Girl (1936)
 General Spanky (1936)
 Way Out West (1937)
 Quicker'n a Wink (1940)
 Going to Press (1942)
 Don't Lie (1942)
 Surprised Parties (1942)
 Harrigan's Kid (1943)
 Air Raid Wardens (1943)
 Adventure in Music (1944)
 Radio Bugs (1944)
 Gentle Annie (1944)

References

External links

American cinematographers
1892 births
1952 deaths
People from Chicago